The Lone Ranger (Original Motion Picture Score) is the film score for the Walt Disney Pictures film, The Lone Ranger by Hans Zimmer, released on CD and digital download on July 2, 2013 by Walt Disney Records. The physical release was in association with Intrada Records.

Walt Disney Records also released a separate soundtrack and concept album titled, The Lone Ranger: Wanted (Music Inspired by the Film) by various artists on July 2.

The Lone Ranger (Original Motion Picture Score)

Originally, Jack White was hired to compose the score for the film. White however, declined, and was replaced with Hans Zimmer.

The Lone Ranger: Wanted (Music Inspired by the Film)

Director Gore Verbinski, who also serves as the album's producer, described the compilation and roster as "...the artists we listened to on the way to set each morning and in the evenings with the dust, like bitter chalk, upon our teeth." Tracks by Grace Potter and The Nocturnals and Lucinda Williams were previewed on Rolling Stone and Billboard weeks before their official release.

See also
Lone Ranger music

References

2013 soundtrack albums
Folk rock soundtracks
Soundtrack
Outlaw country albums
Walt Disney Records soundtracks
Concept albums
Intrada Records soundtracks
Hans Zimmer soundtracks
Disney film soundtracks